Kressida (minor planet designation: 548 Kressida) is a minor planet orbiting the Sun. It is named after the theatrical character Cressida.

References

External links 
 
 

000548
Discoveries by Paul Götz
Named minor planets
000548
19041014